Video Game High School (often abbreviated VGHS) is an American action comedy web series from RocketJump Studios. It was written by Matthew Arnold, Will Campos and Brian Firenzi and directed by Matthew Arnold, Brandon Laatsch, and Freddie Wong. RocketJump Studios describes the series as "a show about best friends, first loves, and landing that perfect head shot". The team at RocketJump chose to make a web series because they "strongly believe the foundations for the future of digitally distributed content will be laid by web series".

Since its release in 2012, the series has been viewed more than 150 million times on various online platforms.

Premise
The series is set in the near future where video games elevate their best players to stardom by their position as the world's most popular competitive sport. Video Game High School (VGHS) is an elite and prestigious facility that teaches a curriculum of video games of all genres.

The show's protagonist, BrianD, gains entry to the school after unwittingly defeating "The Law", an international first-person shooter star, on live television. The show follows BrianD and the friends and enemies he makes at the school, playing on standard tropes of school dramas with a video game background.

The show uses live-action scenes with the characters to show action within the games. The games depicted are inventions of the show, with the most prominent being a first-person shooter named Field of Fire.

Cast

Main
 Josh Blaylock as Brian Doheny (commonly referred to as BrianD), an FPS player and the main protagonist of the series. He is also Jenny's boyfriend.
 Johanna Braddy as Jennifer Matthews (commonly referred to as Jenny Matrix), sophomore Junior Varsity team captain. She is The Law's girlfriend in season 1, and Brian's love interest and later girlfriend.
 Brian Firenzi as Lawrence Pemberton (commonly referred to as The Law; seasons 1–2; recurring season 3), the world's #1 amateur gamer. He is Jenny Matrix's boyfriend in season 1 and the principal antagonist of the season. In seasons 2 and 3, he takes the role of an antihero.
 Ellary Porterfield as Kimberly Swan (commonly referred to as Ki Swan), a video game developer and fighting game specialist who goes to the school to learn more about players. She is Ted's girlfriend and one of Brian's friends.
 Cynthia Watros as Mary Matrix (seasons 2–3), coach for the FPS Varsity team and Jenny's mother.
 Jimmy Wong as Theodore Wong (commonly referred to as Ted, and occasionally the gamertag Gr8fulTed), Brian's best friend, Ki's boyfriend, and the son of Rhythm Game teacher Freddie Wong. Ted wants to pursue rhythm games to impress his father, despite being more talented at racing games.
Nathan Kress as New Law (season 3), who comes into play after The Law is kicked off of Napalm Energy's High School FPS team and is given The Law's I.P. and title. Due to this he is often now referred to as The Law.

Supporting

 Chase Williamson as Shane Barnstormer (Seasons 2 & 3) (also goes under the alias Shane Pizza), the head R.A. and eventual class president. He is the main antagonist of seasons two and three, along with his brother Ashley.
 Bryan Forrest as Ashley Barnstormer (Seasons 2 & 3), Shane's fraternal twin brother and the co-antagonist of season three.
 Joey Scoma as Randall Merryweather (goes under the alias Jumpin' Jax), a dim-witted FPS team member.
 Benji Dolly as Games Dean, an FPS team member with a suave personality.
 Nicole Wyland as Moriarty, an FPS team member 
 Meghan Camarena as Rapwnzel, an FPS team member
 Rocky Collins as the Drift King (commonly referred to as D.K.), a senior student and the captain/monarch of the Drift Racing team. In Season 3, Episode 5 he was challenged by Ted for the Drift King title. After Ted is near the finish line, he stops and gives D.K. the voucher that was confiscated by Calhoun. Seeing this happen, he proposes that Ted be the next Drift King after he graduates. Ted rejects this by saying he "has a career" in selling Napalm Green Corn Dogs at the Napalm Mega Mall as a summer job. 
 Joel Dauten as Scott Slanders, co-host of PwnZwn.
 Clinton Jones as ShotBot, robot co-host of PwnZwn.
 Will Campos as the voice of ShotBot
 Nat'han as the Tutor of NukeInc
 Zachary Levi as Ace (Season 1), teacher of FPS 101.
 Harley Morenstein as Dean Ernie Calhoun, a former VGHS student who values the heart of the game itself.
 Brennan Murray as Wendell (Seasons 2 & 3) (gamertag TacoBoy14), a dorky student and also close friend of Ki. He often helps out with Ki, especially during her election for class president; this also led to the two falling out. However they eventually become friends again. 
 Freddie Wong as a fictionalized version of himself. He is a world-famous rhythm gaming expert who teaches rhythm gaming at VGHS, and is the father of Ted Wong. In Season 3, Episode 4 he dies after an accident while he was riding his motorbike without a helmet. According to Ted, Freddie had no idea how to ride a motorbike.

Guests and cameos

 Matthew Arnold as Zoostcaster
 Cliff Bleszinski as TheJackrabbit
 Will Campos as Buddy Phelps
 Joanna Sotomura as The Duchess Of Kart
 Wesley Chan as K-Pop
 Arden Cho as Korean TV Host
 Maddy Rae Cooper as O'Doyle
 Desmond Dolly as Acid Reflux, Quad Student #2, and Goon 2
 Justine Ezarik as Bella
 Chris Hardwick as Newsanchor
 Tony Hawk as Tony Hawk
 John Hennigan as Crazy Napalm Suit
 Clinton Jones as Clint Lockwood
 Brandon Laatsch as Brandon
 Shira Lazar as Rosalie 
 Stan Lee as Stan L33t
 Tara Macken as Ronin
 Joel McHale as The President of the United States
 Burnie Burns and Joel Heyman as board members
 Ruben Raul as Criptix (Season 2 & 3)
 Ashton Paudi as AshiX (Season 1 & 2)
 Ethan Newberry as Clutch
 Conan O'Brien as Newsanchor
 Kara Petersen as Freezerburn
 Noah as Cheeto the Cat
 Michael Rousselet as Alliterator
 Jon Salmon as Chip Trigger
 Ashton Pooley as Relief Coach (Season 2)
 Nathan Frost as Enemy Team Sniper (Season 1)
 Phillip Wang as Oldboy
 LeeAnna Vamp as Esme
 Maureen McCormick as Mrs. Barnstormer

Production and release

Video Game High School is co-created by Freddie Wong, Will Campos, Brian Firenzi and Matt Arnold. In addition to acting as showrunner, Arnold is also a writer, as are Campos and Firenzi (founder of 5secondfilms.com). The series is based on a concept by Campos and Chris Pappavaselio.

The team was able to fund the series through Kickstarter, where they set a funding goal for $75,000 to be raised in a 30-day period. That amount was quickly pledged in less than 24 hours and continued to climb from there. On October 22, 2011, pledging came to a close, with $273,725 raised for the project from 5,661 backers.

Principal photography began on October 25, and ended in late November. The final four days of shooting took place at the Eagle Mountain iron mine and Mojave Desert. Post-production started shortly after and ended in early 2012. The trailer for the series premiered on YouTube on May 11, 2012, on the "Freddiew" channel.

Later, the first season of the show was edited into a two-hour movie and released on DVD, Blu-ray, and online.

Episodes

Season 1 episodes were released in May, June, and July 2012, first on the RocketJump website, and a week later on YouTube channel "freddiew". People who pledged to the project's fundraiser received HD digital downloads and DVDs. The Kickstarter fundraiser for season 2 ended in February 2013 with the project more than sufficiently funded. The second season was released in July and August 2013.

In July 2013, Freddie Wong said that a third season was being worked on, and filming began in March 2014. Season 3 episodes were being released once per week starting on October 13, or could be purchased for immediate viewing through Vimeo On Demand, which includes 4K HD, HD, and SD downloads of the episode(s) purchased. RocketJump announced on October 30 that season 3 would be the last of the series.

Netflix previously streamed all three seasons of the show, but only season 3 was available in 4K UHD, with most episodes doubled up to make individual 30-minute episodes.

References

External links 
www.rocketjump.com/vghs
vimeo.com/ondemand/vghs3

2010s YouTube series
2012 web series debuts
2014 web series endings
American comedy web series
Esports television series
Fictional schools
Kickstarter-funded web series
Streamy Award-winning channels, series or shows
Works set in the future